The Harris shutter is a strip device with three color filters, invented by Robert S. "Bob" Harris of Kodak, for making color photographs with the different primary color layers exposed in separate time intervals in succession.  The term Harris shutter is also applied to the technique or effect.

The effect is produced by re-exposing the same frame of film through red, green and blue filters in turn, while keeping the camera steady. This will generate a rainbow of colour around any object that moves within the frame. Some good candidates for subjects include waterfalls (pictured, left), clouds blowing over a landscape or people walking across a busy town square.

Traditionally, the technique is either achieved using a camera that allows in-register multiple exposures, and changing filters on the front of the lens. Another alternative was to make a drop through filter that consisted of the three coloured gels and two opaque sections that is literally dropped through a filter holder during exposure.

With the advent of digital photography, the process has become much simpler – the photographer can simply take three colour photographs on location, and then use software to take the Red channel from one exposure, combine with the blue and green channels from the other two photos to good effect – this may even allow for correction of movement if the camera is inadvertently moved between exposures. Another advantage of digital processing is that different results can be obtained by reassigning the RGB channel of each layer.

References

External links
 Shutterbug

Photographic techniques